Rubyanna is a rural locality in the Bundaberg Region, Queensland, Australia. In the  Rubyanna had a population of 244 people.

History 
The name Rubyanna comes from the sugarcane plantation of surveyor John Charlton Thompson, whose plantation was supposedly named for his wife.

Rubyanna Provisional School opened circa 1899 and closed on 1905.

In the  Rubyanna had a population of 244 people.

Amenities 
Bundaberg Bible Church is at 400 Bargara Road.

References

External links 

Bundaberg Region
Localities in Queensland